Marcala Airport  was an airport formerly serving Marcala, a municipality in La Paz Department, Honduras.

Aerial imaging shows a soccer stadium built midfield on the former  grass runway, with buildings covering both the north and south ends.

Google Earth Historical Images show the soccer field was completed and the airport closed sometime prior to 2002.

See also

Transport in Honduras
List of airports in Honduras

References

Defunct airports
Airports in Honduras
La Paz Department (Honduras)